Gopal Prasad Vyas (13 February 1915 – 28 May 2005) was an Indian poet, known for his humorous poems. His poems have been compiled into several books such as To Mein Kya Karoon, Ras Rasamrit, Maff Kijiye and Baat Baat Mein Baat. The story of his life has been documented in a biography, Bahuayami Jeevan Ke Dhani Pt Gopal Prasad Vyas, written by Santosh Matta, published by Prabhat Books in 2015. He was honoured by the Government of India in 1965, with the award of Padma Shri, the fourth highest Indian civilian award for his contributions to the field of literature.

Biography

Early life
Gopal Prasad Vyas was born, according to his school certificate, on 13 February 1915 in Mahmadpur, near Gowardhan town, Mathura, Uttar Pradesh. He was educated in Mathura only up to Class 7. He was unable go for examination for that due to Indian Independence Movement.

Marriage
He was married to Asharfi Devi, daughter of Pratap Ji from Hindaun, Karauli District, Rajasthan in 1931.

Career
He was an editor in Dainik Hindustan, Sahitya Sandesh, Rajasthan Patrika, Sanmarg and Editor in Chief of Vikassheel Bharat. He was active in column writing from 1937 and till his death. He was the founder of Rastriya Kavi-Sammelan, an event held annually at the Red Fort.

Death
He died on Saturday, 28 May 2005 at his residence at B-52, Gulmohar Park, New Delhi.

Notes

References

Further reading

External links

Recipients of the Padma Shri in literature & education
1915 births
2005 deaths
20th-century Indian poets
Indian male poets
20th-century Indian male writers